The Church of the Immaculate Conception (Italian: Chiesa dell'Immacolata Concezione or Immacolata Concezione al Capo) is a Baroque church of Palermo. It is located on the busy streets composing the markets of the Capo, in the quarter of the Seralcadio, within the historic centre of Palermo.

This monastic church is on via Porta Carini, across the street from the parish church of Sant'Ippolito. It was built between 1604 and 1740 and is finely decorated with many works of Sicilian artists like Giacomo Amato, Pietro Novelli, Olivio Sòzzi, Giuseppe Velasco and Carlo D'Aprile.

Gallery

External links 
 Gaspare Palermo, Guida istruttiva per potersi conoscere tutte le magnificenze della Città di Palermo, Volume IV, Palermo, Reale Stamperia, 1816

Roman Catholic churches in Palermo
Baroque architecture in Palermo
17th-century Roman Catholic church buildings in Italy
1740 establishments in Italy